Jeffrey Ige (born 4 December 1982) is a Paralympic athlete from Sweden who competes in T20 classification shot put events. Ige represented Sweden at the 2012 Summer Paralympics in London, where he won the silver medal in the shot put. As well as Paralympic success, Ige has won both the World and European Championship titles in his sport, in 2011 and 2014 respectively.

References 

Paralympic athletes of Sweden
Athletes (track and field) at the 2012 Summer Paralympics
Paralympic silver medalists for Sweden
Living people
1982 births
Swedish male shot putters
Medalists at the 2012 Summer Paralympics
Athletes from Stockholm
Paralympic medalists in athletics (track and field)
Competitors in athletics with intellectual disability